Russ Titelman (born August 16, 1944, Los Angeles, California) is an American record producer and songwriter. He has to date won three Grammy Awards. He earned his first producing the Steve Winwood song "Higher Love", and his second and third for Eric Clapton's Journeyman and Unplugged albums, respectively. Titelman also produced Clapton's 24 Nights live album of 1990 and the all-blues album From the Cradle, released in 1994.

Biography
Titelman began his musical career in the 1960s. He was the rhythm guitarist in the house band on the television show Shindig! He studied sitar for a year under Ravi Shankar, at the latter's Kinnara School of Music in Los Angeles. He has worked with rock musicians such as Nancy Sinatra, The Monkees, Dion DiMucci, George Harrison, Bee Gees, Little Feat, Christine McVie, Meat Loaf, Paul Simon, Brian Wilson, The Allman Brothers Band, James Taylor, Rickie Lee Jones, Chaka Khan with Rufus and solo, Ry Cooder, Randy Newman, Gordon Lightfoot, Eric Clapton, Steve Winwood, Neil Young, Crazy Horse and Gerry Goffin. After having worked for Warner Bros. Records for 20 years, Titelman has been an independent producer since 1997.

Titelman started his independent music label Walking Liberty Records in New York. One of his first productions for the label was the debut album by the Oklahoma-based singer-songwriter Jared Tyler. Released in 2005, Blue Alleluia included guest appearances from Emmylou Harris, Mac McAnally and Mary Kay Place.

Selected production credits
Randy Newman
 Sail Away (1972)
 Good Old Boys (1974)
 Little Criminals (1977)
 Born Again (1979)
 Trouble in Paradise (1983)

Ry Cooder
 Paradise and Lunch (1974)

James Taylor
 Gorilla (1975)
 October Road (2002)

George Harrison
 George Harrison (1979)

Rickie Lee Jones
 Rickie Lee Jones (1979)
 Pirates (1981)

Rufus and Chaka Khan
 Stompin' at the Savoy – Live (1983)
Christine McVie
 Christine McVie (1984)

Steve Winwood
 Back in the High Life (1986)

Brian Wilson 
 Brian Wilson (1988)

Chaka Khan
 CK (1988)

Eric Clapton
 Journeyman (1989)
 Unplugged (1992)

Meat Loaf
 The Very Best of Meat Loaf (track: "Is Nothing Sacred") (1998)

Cyndi Lauper
 At Last'' (2003)

References

External links
 Songwriter101.com

1944 births
Living people
Writers from Los Angeles
Record producers from California
Jewish American songwriters
Songwriters from California
Grammy Award winners
Pupils of Ravi Shankar
21st-century American Jews